Volatility is an open-source memory forensics framework for incident response and malware analysis.  It is written in Python and supports Microsoft Windows, Mac OS X, and Linux (as of version 2.5).

Volatility was created by Aaron Walters, drawing on academic research he did in memory forensics.

Operating system support

Volatility supports investigations of the following memory images:

Windows:
 32-bit Windows XP (Service Pack 2 and 3)
 32-bit Windows 2003 Server (Service Pack 0, 1, 2)
 32-bit Windows Vista (Service Pack 0, 1, 2)
 32-bit Windows 2008 Server (Service Pack 1, 2)
 32-bit Windows 7 (Service Pack 0, 1)
 32-bit Windows 8, 8.1, and 8.1 Update 1
 32-bit Windows 10 (initial support)
 64-bit Windows XP (Service Pack 1 and 2)
 64-bit Windows 2003 Server (Service Pack 1 and 2)
 64-bit Windows Vista (Service Pack 0, 1, 2)
 64-bit Windows 2008 Server (Service Pack 1 and 2)
 64-bit Windows 2008 R2 Server (Service Pack 0 and 1)
 64-bit Windows 7 (Service Pack 0 and 1)
 64-bit Windows 8, 8.1, and 8.1 Update 1
 64-bit Windows Server 2012 and 2012 R2
 64-bit Windows 10 (including at least 10.0.14393)
 64-bit Windows Server 2016 (including at least 10.0.14393.0)

Mac OSX:
 32-bit 10.5.x Leopard (the only 64-bit 10.5 is Server, which isn't supported)
 32-bit 10.6.x Snow Leopard
 32-bit 10.7.x Lion
 64-bit 10.6.x Snow Leopard
 64-bit 10.7.x Lion
 64-bit 10.8.x Mountain Lion
 64-bit 10.9.x Mavericks
 64-bit 10.10.x Yosemite
 64-bit 10.11.x El Capitan
 64-bit 10.12.x Sierra
 64-bit 10.13.x High Sierra
 64-bit 10.14.x Mojave
 64-bit 10.15.x Catalina

Linux:
 32-bit Linux kernels 2.6.11 to 5.5
 64-bit Linux kernels 2.6.11 to 5.5
 OpenSuSE, Ubuntu, Debian, CentOS, Fedora, Mandriva, etc.

Memory format support

Volatility supports a variety of sample file formats and the ability to convert between these formats:

 Raw/Padded Physical Memory
 Firewire (IEEE 1394)
 Expert Witness (EWF)
 32- and 64-bit Windows Crash Dump
 32- and 64-bit Windows Hibernation (from Windows 7 or earlier)
 32- and 64-bit Mach-O files
 Virtualbox Core Dumps
 VMware Saved State (.vmss) and Snapshot (.vmsn)
 HPAK Format (FastDump)
 QEMU memory dumps 
 LiME format

References

Computer forensics